Al Mamoura (also spelled Al Ma'amoura) is a district in the municipality of Al Rayyan in Qatar. Many international schools are found here.

Landmarks

Leisure and sports landmarks
Al Mamoura Park on Wadi Basah Street.
Al Khulaifat Park North on Al Khulaifat Park North Street.
Bu Samra Park on Al Khulaifat Park South Street.
Fereej Al Mamoura Stadium, managed by the Qatar Olympic Committee, on Rabiat Street.

Commercial landmarks
Al Mamoura International Exhibition Center on Abu Hamour Street.
Al Maamoura Complex on Ahmed bin Zaidoun Street.

Government landmarks
Al Mamoura Traffic Police and Faza Department on Wholesale Market Street.
General Cleanliness Department of the Ministry of Municipality and Environment (MME) on D Ring Road.
Mechanical Equipment Department of the MME on Abu Hamour Compound Street.
Central Laboratories Department of the MME on Street 796.

Cultural and social landmarks
Dreama Empowerment for the Orphans is found on Al Afnan Street.

The Girls' Creativity Center is located in Al Mamoura. It was founded in 2001 as the Girls' Creative Art Center and renamed to its current name in 2003. Classes in arts and crafts are held at the center.

There is Indian Cultural Center in Al Mamoura. It is affiliated with the Embassy of India in Doha.

Qatar's Cultural Center for the Deaf is located here near the Wholesale Market. As a member of the World Federation of the Deaf, the center helps organize community activities, assists deaf individuals in obtaining employment, lobbies for deaf rights in the legislature, and provides education and training in the Qatari Unified Sign Language.

Education

The following schools are located in Al Mamoura:

References

Populated places in Al Rayyan